Good Views, Bad News is the second album by the punk rock band Broadway Calls. It was recorded at Blasting Room in Fort Collins, Colorado, Produced by Descendents drummer Bill Stevenson & Jason Livermore.

Release
The album was preceded by the single "Be All That You Can't Be", released on July 21, 2009 on 7" vinyl in 3 colours. On August 4, 2009, "Tonight Is Alive" was posted on the band's Myspace profile. Three days later, a music video was released for "Be All You Can't Be". On the album's release date, each of the tracks were made available for streaming through a different website, such as "Midnight Hour" through Punknews.org. They appeared at the Reading and Leeds Festivals in the UK in August 2009. Following this, they supported Streetlight Manifesto on their North American tour. In October and November 2009, they supported the Bouncing Souls on their headlining US tour, and appeared at The Fest. In November and December 2009, they went on a European tour with Set Your Goals and Fireworks. In January 2010, the band supported Anti-Flag on their headlining US tour for a few shows. In March 2010, the band appeared at Harvest of Hope Fest and the South by Southwest music conference. Bookending these performances were a handful of shows with Red City Radio and Cobra Skulls. Following this, the band went on a North American tour with the Flatliners and Cobra Skulls until April 2010. Additional dates were added, extending the trek into May 2010. On May 13, 2010 a music video was released for "Basement Royalty". In August 2010, the band performed at the Summer Sonic Festival in Japan.

Track listing

Bonus tracks

Personnel 

Ty Vaughn - Lead Vocals/Guitar 
Matt Koenig - Bass/Vocals 
Josh Baird - Drums / Percussion

Other Contributors
 Produced by Bill Stevenson & Jason Livermore
 Mixed by Unknown
 Recorded Blasting Room in Fort Collins, Colorado, United States.

References

2009 albums
Broadway Calls albums
SideOneDummy Records albums
Albums produced by Bill Stevenson (musician)